This article is a list of things named after Andrey Markov, an influential Russian mathematician.

 Chebyshev–Markov–Stieltjes inequalities
 Dynamics of Markovian particles
 Dynamic Markov compression
 Gauss–Markov theorem
 Gauss–Markov process
 Markov blanket
 Markov boundary
 Markov chain
 Markov chain central limit theorem
 Additive Markov chain
 Markov additive process
 Absorbing Markov chain
 Continuous-time Markov chain
 Discrete-time Markov chain
 Nearly completely decomposable Markov chain
 Quantum Markov chain
 Telescoping Markov chain
 Markov condition
 Causal Markov condition
  Markov model
 Hidden Markov model
 Hidden semi-Markov model
 Layered hidden Markov model
 Hierarchical hidden Markov model
 Maximum-entropy Markov model
 Variable-order Markov model
 Markov renewal process
 Markov chain mixing time
 Markov kernel
 Piecewise-deterministic Markov process
 Markovian arrival process
 Markov strategy
 Markov information source
 Markov chain Monte Carlo
 Reversible-jump Markov chain Monte Carlo
 Markov chain geostatistics
 Markovian discrimination
 Markov decision process
 Partially observable Markov decision process
 Markov reward model
 Markov switching multifractal
 Markov chain approximation method
 Markov logic network
 Markov chain approximation method
 Markov matrix
 Markov random field
 Lempel–Ziv–Markov chain algorithm
 Markov partition
 Markov property
 Markov odometer
 Markov perfect equilibrium (game theory)
 Markov's inequality
 Markov spectrum in Diophantine equations
 Markov number (Diophantine equations)
Markov tree
Markov's theorem
 Markov time
 Markov brothers' inequality
 Markov–Krein theorem
 Markov–Kakutani fixed-point theorem
 Quantum Markov semigroup
 Riesz–Markov–Kakutani representation theorem

Other
 Markov (crater)
 27514 Markov, a main-belt asteroid

Markov, Andrey